Mario Morán (August 6, 1992, Puebla) is a Mexican actor of television and films.

Biographic dates
He is the youngest of 3 siblings. An older brother and a sister.

Career
He debuted in theater staging "Sexo Sexo Sexo, the musical", with which it was presented in two successful seasons in Puebla and with which visited more than 70 public schools to raise awareness about responsible sexuality in young people. Shortly after he acted with the same work in Mexico City at the Forum Sylvia Pasquel in a 16-week season, equaling the same success as in Puebla. In addition, this work went on tour to cities like Villahermosa, Cancún and Guanajuato, among others.

On television he has participated in Televisa unit as "La Rosa de Guadalupe" and "Como dice el dicho". He starred in the film "Shhh!" premiered at the International Film Festival Acapulco (FICA) in 2013. He also appeared in "No Manches Frida" next to Martha Higareda and Omar Chaparro.

He played the role of Jorge Perez in the soap opera "Pasión y Poder" in Televisa.

He plays the role of Emiliano Cabral in the Soap Opera "La Doña" produced by Argos studios for Telemundo.

He will also appear in the film "Mas Alla de La Herencia" alongside Carmen Aub.

Filmography

References

External links
 https://twitter.com/_MarioMoran
 

21st-century Mexican male actors
People from Puebla (city)
1992 births
Living people
Mexican male stage actors
Mexican male television actors
Male soap opera actors
Male actors from Puebla